The Children's Book Council of Iran (CBC) was founded in 1962. CBC is a non-profit organization formed and run by volunteers. It joined the International Board on Books for Young People (IBBY) in 1964 and represents the Iranian National Section.

Background
The rich oral literature of the early Persian families, comprising lullabies, folktales, and rhythmic fables, narrated by generations of Persian families, dates back over 3000 years.

Iran's societal and cultural requirements have recently prompted a new generation of children's literature. Thus, children's literature became an expertise, and historical studies became necessary to extend a developing children's literature in Iran. Several studies have been undertaken as a result of these efforts. The project on "The History of Children's Literature in Iran" is considered one of the most significant in recent times.

Genres
Over 200 experts and members of Children's Books Council workgroups have contributed to the bibliography of 1438 books in a variety of genres. These include literature, novels, plays, poems, reference books, philosophy, religious literature, social knowledge, science, works written by children and young adults, art, games and entertainment, biographies, and electronic publications.
Some of  these genres are:

Ancient literature
 Nabāt Khānoomi 
 Namaki
 The Amazing Stories of Shahnameh
 The Delightful Stories of one Thousand and One Nights 2
 Zahr-al Rabi, A book of sweet humor and comedy
 The Rolling Pumpkin
 Nokhodi
 The Sweet Fable of Darab Nama
 The Delightful Stories of one Thousand and One Nights 3
 Nizāmi Aroozi’s Four Articles

Fantasy books by Iranian authors

 The Distance that Grew Old
 The Memory Album
 The Story of the Stray Point
 Chichi the Crow
 Ashi Mashi - the Little Sparrow

Poems

 Behind the Scene in My Heart
 Whom Does God Miss?

Awards
Zohreh Qaini, a specialist in children's literature, was nominated for the award in 2021, and Nader Musavi was nominated for the award in 2022.

References

External links

 Official website: www.ibby.org
 Children's Book Council
 Children's Book Week: About CBW

1962 establishments in Iran
Children's literature organizations
Iranian literature